Antony IV (? – May 1397) was the Ecumenical Patriarch of Constantinople for two terms, from January 1389 to July 1390, and again from early 1391 until his death.

He was originally a hieromonk, possibly from the Dionysiou monastery in Mount Athos. He was deposed during the usurpation of John VII Palaiologos in April 1390, and replaced by Macarius, who had already served in the office in 1377–1379. After the restoration of John V Palaiologos and Manuel II Palaiologos a few months later, he was restored to his post.

He is notable for his correspondence with Jagiello, Grand Duke of Lithuania, urging him to join in a crusade against the Turks along with the Hungarians, and with Basil I of Muscovy, to whom he defended not only the universal spiritual authority of the Constantinopolitan patriarchate, but also the universal authority of the Byzantine emperors, regardless of the actual diminished state of the Byzantine Empire.

Sources 
 

14th-century births
1397 deaths
14th-century patriarchs of Constantinople
Byzantine letter writers
14th-century Byzantine monks